Torikai (written: 鳥養) is a Japanese surname. Notable people with the surname include:

, Japanese swimmer
, Japanese composer
, Japanese economist
, Japanese footballer

Japanese-language surnames